Wardsend Cemetery is a Victorian cemetery in the Owlerton district of Sheffield, England, consecrated by the Archbishop of York in 1859 and closed to legal burial in 1968.

History
The ground on which the cemetery stands was originally purchased by John Livesey in 1857, the Vicar of the nearby St. Philip's Church as an overspill burial ground.

The first burial at Wardsend was of a 2-year-old girl named Ann Marie Marsden in 1857. She is, in keeping with tradition, the "Guardian of the Cemetery".

The graveyard is also noteworthy for being the final resting place of George Lambert VC, a highly decorated Irish soldier, for holding graves of many victims of the Great Sheffield Flood of 1864, and being the only cemetery in Britain with an active railway line passing through it.

Sheffield Archives offers much material on the history of the cemetery, perhaps most significantly a detailed narrative account of the 1862 riot and subsequent court hearings entitled Extraordinary Doings in a Cemetery in Sheffield by Ivor Haythorne, and a 2013 dissertation project (heavily influenced by the history from below movement spearheaded by E.P. Thompson and George Rudé) called Crisis of Confidence: The Public Response to the 1862 Sheffield Resurrection Scandal by Jordan Lee Smith.

1862 riot
On the evening of 3 June 1862 the cemetery was the location of a turbulent riot by angry Sheffield citizens, against accusations that the Reverend John Livesey and his sexton Isaac Howard were neglecting to bury corpses, and instead selling them to the town's medical school for use in anatomical dissection. The rumours were proven false and Livesey and Howard were instead fined by York Assizes for reusing graves in order to save space. However both were later paid compensation for the damage caused to their property during the riot, and Livesey was reinstated as the Vicar of St. Philip's Church.

Today Livesey Street, now home to the Hillsborough campus of The Sheffield College as well as the back entrance to Owlerton Stadium is named after the Reverend Livesey.

A memorial stone at the nearby Walled Garden in Hillsborough Park alludes to the unrest; it is a stone four feet long by 18 inches wide, designed to lie flat on the ground and cover a grave. The inscription reads:

Design
The cemetery was originally linked at its Hillsborough entrance by Wardsend Bridge, a two-arched stone structure built in the 18th century exclusively to provide access to the burial ground.

The cemetery also contains an obelisk dedicated to soldiers who died at Sheffield's Hillsborough Barracks, just down the road from the cemetery.

There are also buried here a number of service personnel who died in the First and Second World Wars but because their graves are now unmaintainable by the Commonwealth War Graves Commission their names are listed on a Screen Wall Memorial in Plot H of nearby City Road Cemetery.

Since its loss of status as a legal burial ground Sheffield City Council have done little to maintain the cemetery and it has fallen into neglect, save for the efforts of a conservation group the Friends of Wardsend Cemetery, who along with offering guided walks of the site, aim to cull the Japanese knotweed that has overgrown the area.

References

External links
 Jordan Lee Smith in Sheffield Archives
 Reflections on a first visit to Wardsend

Cemeteries in Sheffield
Anglican cemeteries in the United Kingdom
1859 establishments in England
1862 riots
1862 in England
History of Sheffield
History of South Yorkshire
Battles and conflicts without fatalities
Riots and civil disorder in England
Commonwealth War Graves Commission cemeteries in England